Aley Green is a hamlet in Bedfordshire, England.

Aley Green is within the civil parish of Caddington. However, the cemetery and the southern end of Mancroft Road (including Aley Green Methodist Church) are in the parish of Slip End, though they are considered to be part of Aley Green.

Throughout its history, Aley Green has been a border settlement between Bedfordshire and Hertfordshire. The settlement formerly straddled the border of the two counties, until boundary changes in 1965 brought Aley Green entirely into Bedfordshire.

References

External links 
Aley Green pages at the Bedfordshire and Luton Archives and Records Service

Villages in Bedfordshire
Central Bedfordshire District